Ershui Township is a rural township in southeastern Changhua County, Taiwan.

Geography
Ershui is bordered on the north by Tianzhong Township, to the east by Mingjian Township in Nantou County, and to the west by Xizhou Township. Its name means, literally, "Two Waters", which is a reference to the two irrigation canals constructed in the township,  1 and 2, linking the waters from the nearby Zhuoshui River to the fertile Changhua Plain. Ershui is known for its picturesque scenery and the nearby Bagua Mountain Range, and offers many biking and hiking trails. The bulk of Ershui's population lives near its central plaza in front of the Ershui railway station, on the Western Line on the TRA's railway network.

Ershui encompasses  and a population of 14,165, including 8,126 males and 7,363 females as of January 2017.

History
The township's former name refers to Babao canals 1 and 2, which take water from the Choshui River to irrigate the farmlands of Changhua. The canals are known as the "Mother Rivers of Changhua", spreading out in a fan-shaped distribution throughout Changhua county and creating a fertile plain for agriculture.

Records of habitation at Ershui has been documented all the way back to 1621, in the Ming dynasty. The first inhabitants first came from Fujian, mainland China to Lukang, Changhua County, and then to the foothills of the Bagua mountain range. The settlers co-existed with the indigenous people, and began farming, irrigated by spring water from the mountains. The population at that time was roughly 300.

After the construction of Babao canal 1 during Qing rule, the population spread outwards from the Bagua foothills towards the canal itself. Farms emerged on both sides of the canal, and this farming boom increased the population to 1700 people, or around 300 households. With the construction of the passenger and freight station, local businesses emerged on 1 km of the station front street, which was accelerated by the formal construction of the TRA Nisui Station in 1918. Finally, the construction of a pineapple canning plant in 1932 began an economic boom for Nisui, making it the most prosperous town in the Choshui River region at the time.

Administrative divisions
The township comprises 17 villages: Changhe, Dayuan, Ershui, Fuxing, Gehe, Gexing, Guanghua, Guozun, Huimin, Shangli, Shenghua, Shiwu, Wenhua, Wuba, Xiuren, Yuanquan and Yumin.

Tourist attractions 

A popular spot for tourists and locals alike is the nearby Songboling Recreational Area. The recreational area consists of hiking trails in the Bagua Mountain range, and stretches from Ershuei township into Tianzhong township to the north of it, as well as Mingjian township in Nantou.

The various trails in Songboling, known for their beauty and breathtaking scenery, are also known for the rock macaque monkeys which inhabit the woods along the trails. The population of these macaque monkeys have boomed after tourists began feeding them. However, the local rock macaque preservation society has urged people not to feed them, since it reduces their ability to forage on their own, and overpopulation can also cause starvation.

Transportation 

The Ershui Station was established in 1918. The Ershui station is on the TRA Western Line, and it is the transfer station for the TRA Branch Jiji Line railroad operated by the TRA. It is designated as a second-tier train station in the TRA system.

Notable natives
 Hsieh Tung-min, Vice President of the Republic of China (1978–1984)
 Timothy Yang, Secretary-General of the Presidential Office (2012-2015)

References

Townships in Changhua County